James Daniel Gordon is a broadcast journalist and radio presenter for BBC News and the Mail Online. He is a correspondent covering America, especially New York. He writes online articles: topics covered have included the controversy over selling school places overseas, the forgotten residents of Louisiana whose town resides in the "spillaway area" in case of flooding, New York's homeless stealing people's trash and the end of NASA's Space Shuttle program.

Early career
Graduating from the University of Cardiff, Gordon's career began with presenting news packages for BBC Radio Yorkshire. Following a period working as a journalist for Newsbeat and BBC News 24 at the BBC Television Centre in London, Gordon moved to the BBC's New York.

Gordon is married to CNET Associate Producer, Sally Neiman.

Gordon presents a regular Saturday evening show on UKCountryRadio.com.

In 2018, Gordon moved to Harlem in Manhattan.

References

Living people
BBC newsreaders and journalists
Year of birth missing (living people)